Markos Kounalakis (born December 1, 1956) is an American syndicated journalist and scholar who is the second gentleman of California as the husband of lieutenant governor Eleni Kounalakis. Kounalakis writes a syndicated weekly foreign affairs column for The Miami Herald and McClatchy-Tribune News and is a frequent foreign affairs analyst for CBS News and CNN International. Kounalakis' last syndicated weekly column appeared in the Miami Herald on November 6, 2020. His 2018 National Society of Newspaper Columnists award stated that "Kounalakis's world affairs columns not only offer strong prose and strong opinions, they offer an education." In 2019, he won a SPJ Sunshine State Award for his foreign affairs commentary and criticism.

Kounalakis is a visiting fellow at the Hoover Institution and a senior fellow at the Center for Media, Data, and Society at Central European University.

Kounalakis is president and publisher emeritus of the Washington Monthly, a magazine founded by Charles Peters in 1969. Along with Ray Suarez, he co-hosts the WorldAffairs podcast and syndicated radio program. He co-anchored with Peter Laufer the nationally syndicated weekly political program, Washington Monthly on the Radio.

Early life and education 
Kounalakis was born on December 1, 1956, in San Francisco to Greek immigrants. His mother Vasiliki Rozakis, was born in Chania, Crete, Greece.  His father, Antonios Markos Kounalakis, was an underground guerrilla fighter against the Nazis on the island of Crete during World War II; he fought with Constantine Mitsotakis, who later became Prime Minister of Greece. Antonios and Vasiliki arrived in the United States as beneficiaries of the displaced persons refugee program and sponsored by the World Council of Churches.

Kounalakis received a public education in the San Francisco Bay Area and earned his bachelor's degree in political science at the University of California, Berkeley in 1978. Kounalakis worked his way through college working at Dewey Market in San Francisco's Forest Hill neighborhood, and at Tony's Olympic Bayshore gas station and auto repair in San Francisco's Visitation Valley neighborhood. On the UC Berkeley campus, he drove Humphrey Go-Bart buses to help cover tuition costs and rent. He received his MSc in journalism from Columbia University in 1988. Kounalakis earned a PhD in international relations/political science from the Central European University in 2016.

In 1988-1989, Kounalakis was a Robert Bosch Foundation fellow in Europe, attending the Bundesakademie für öffentliche Verwaltung in Bonn, Germany in 1988 and the École Nationale d'Administration in Paris, France in 1989. In 1995-1996, Kounalakis was an International Journalism Graduate Fellow at the University of Southern California and El Colegio de México in Mexico City. As an international journalism graduate fellow, he also spent time in Guatemala (1995) and Cuba (1996). In the early 1980s, he attended the International Graduate School at Stockholm University, Sweden, where he studied international relations and became a fluent Swedish speaker.

Career

Academics
Kounalakis is a political scientist specializing in international relations. His research focuses on the effects global media have on foreign policy. Using an interdisciplinary approach, Kounalakis utilizes theories on communications, neoclassical realism, soft power, and rising powers in his research. Between 2003 and 2009, Kounalakis was a regular Hoover Institution Media Fellow and has been a visiting fellow at the Hoover Institution at Stanford University since September 2013. Since 2010, he has been a Senior Fellow  at the Center for Media, Data and Society at Central European University. In 2017, he became a Senior Research Fellow at the University of Oregon-UNESCO Crossings Institute for Intercultural Dialogue and Conflict Sensitive Reporting.

Journalism
Kounalakis worked as a foreign correspondent for NBC Radio and Mutual News in the USSR, based in Moscow from 1991 to 1992. He previously reported for Newsweek on the fall of the Berlin Wall and the end of the Cold War in Hungary, Czechoslovakia, East Germany, Bulgaria, and Albania. Newsweek also sent him to cover the early phase of the Yugoslav civil war. He went to Afghanistan and covered the "Holy War Without End" for Los Angeles Times Magazine.

In 2002, The New York Times called him a "White Knight" for saving Washington Monthly magazine. Publisher Kounalakis and editor Paul Glastris have since rejuvenated the magazine, grown its readership, and increased its impact, making it a "progressive must-read" in Washington, D.C., according to James Carville. Its expose of former education secretary William Bennett's gambling problem brought early attention to the Kounalakis–Glastris team.

Service
Kounalakis was appointed by President Barack Obama to serve on the J. William Fulbright Foreign Scholarship Board. He has served on the board of visitors at the Columbia University Graduate School of Journalism; board of advisors at Georgetown College and the Wilson Council at the Woodrow Wilson International Center for Scholars. He was the vice chairman of the board of advisors at the Southeast Europe Project at WWICS; he was a trustee of the World Affairs Council of Northern California; and formerly served as chairman of Internews Network 2002–2004; vice chairman of the California State World Trade Commission 2001–2003; and board of trustees of the Western Policy Center from 2001 to 2005. In June 2003, he chaired a multinational reconstruction conference in Athens, Greece where Iraq's media laws were drafted. He has been a trustee of The Asia Foundation since 2020 and joined the advisory board of the Council for International Relations in Greece in 2021.

Kounalakis and his wife, Eleni Tsakopoulos Kounalakis, have established two chairs in politics and democracy at Georgetown University and Stanford University Kounalakis and his wife also donated land to a foundation that is being used establish a Hillsdale College campus in Placer County, California.

Technology 
Kounalakis was a co-founder in  1983 of Earwax Productions, a San Francisco audio production house. The other partners were Jim McKee, Barney Jones and Jean-François Denis. Originally, Earwax was the production facility for his syndicated foreign affairs radio program (on KCBS and KALW in San Francisco), "Spotlight on World Affairs."

In the 1980s, the Earwax team received a New American Radio grant to produce an original take on the homeless population in San Francisco's Tenderloin District, titled "Songs from the Tenderloin." The unique form of musical audio-documentary became known as an "Audiograph" -- a term coined by Kounalakis. He produced and performed segments of Antenna Theater's interactive Walkmanology performances, directed by Antenna's Chris Hardman.

Kounalakis continued his long-term collaboration with Earwax and produced an Apple Computer internally-distributed monthly informational program -- and a precursor to modern podcasting -- titled "Enterprise Edition," between 1992 and 1997 with co-host Peter Hirschberg.

He also wrote and produced Antenna Audio's first audio guide at the DeYoung Museum for the acclaimed "Ansel Adams: One with Beauty" photography show, curated by James and Mary Street Alinder. Kounalakis later wrote the six-language Grey Line's City Tour of San Francisco, co-produced with Earwax.

In 1995, Kounalakis became the executive producer for Visible Interactive, a start-up technology company that used Newton handheld devices for immersive interpretive experiences in venues like the Smithsonian Institution museums. He later became the executive communications strategist at Silicon Graphics, working closely with CEOs Ed McCracken and Rick Belluzzo, as well as senior executives Kai-Fu Lee and Beau Vrolyk.

Views

Russia - A state sponsor of terror 
Kounalakis was an early outspoken critic of Vladimir Putin's authoritarian turn. Following the downing of Malaysia Airlines flight 17 and the killing of 298 people in July 2014, he stated that "Russia is now clearly a state sponsor of terror."

His many columns identified Putin's ambitions and warned that the Russian president's unchallenged killings at homeas well as extraterritorial aggression and murders would increase in frequency and scale.

In 2018, Kounalakis asserted that Putin used Russia's oil and gas as a strategic weapon against the West, and that "instead of punishing bad behavior, however, the world has both financially rewarded Putin and shown him new incentives to continue his aggression — both at home and in Ukraine."

China - Opium war & fentanyl 
In 2017, Kounalakis identified early that fentanyl was a cheap and lethal street drug and cutting agent emanating from China, strategically targeting vulnerable American citizens. He characterized this as a People’s Republic of China’s chemical attack on the United States and wrote that this deployment and non-kinetic warfare tactic was “China’s 21st century Opium War against America.”

Spin Wars - FARA & CCTV/CGTN/RT 
Kounalakis's 2018 book, “Spin Wars & Spy Games: Global Media and Intelligence Gathering” (Hoover Institution Press) warned open systems and democratic societies that Russian and Chinese global media organizations use their foreign bureaus as both diplomatic outposts and spy nests. Russia Today (RT), China Global Television Network (CGTN), and Xinhua were organizations he suggested be registered under the U.S. Foreign Agents Registration Act (FARA). His book provided the data, insights, and policy prescriptions supporting this policy.

$100 bill 
Following Russia’s invasion of Ukraine, Kounalakis wrote in The Wall Street Journal that the United States should “Immediately stop circulating and honoring $100 bills in Russia” in order to foment discontent amongst average Russians, who hold the currency as security. His recommendation was also intended to harm international drug cartels.

Ukraine & nukes 
Ukraine’s vulnerability to Russian aggression was called out in his multiple columns identifying Kyiv’s deterrence weakness as well as threats to global nuclear disarmament He argued that “the U.S., NATO and others must do what it takes to prove a nation like Ukraine can remain sovereign even though it gave up weapons of mass destruction.”

Energy Security 
In 2019, after a strong electoral showing by Germany’s Green Party, Kounalakis wrote that the party’s antipathy to nuclear energy and coal plants was a laudable environmental move but put the country – and Europe – in a vulnerably dependent position regarding energy security. He warned that “tragically, a Europe without nuclear power plants and absent dirty, polluting coal-fired plants is a geopolitically weakened Europe dependent on Russia.” The 2022 Russian invasion of Ukraine proved his argument right.

Personal life 
Kounalakis married Eleni Tsakopoulos in Istanbul in 2000. The couple has two sons. His wife served as the U.S. Ambassador to Hungary until 2013 and won the 2018 election for Lieutenant Governor of California, taking office in January 2019.

Like his father, Kounalakis was a blue-collar construction worker who maintains his Class A heavy equipment truck drivers license.

Published works

Books
Freedom isn't Free: The Price of World Order (February 2022)
Defying Gravity: The Making of Newton (1993)
Beyond Spin: The Power of Strategic Corporate Journalism (with Drew Banks, 1999)
Hope is a Tattered Flag: Voices of Reason and Change for the Post-Bush Era (June 2008)
Reflections 1980-82: Markos Kounalakis (October 2012)
Spin Wars & Spy Games: Global Media and Intelligence Gathering (July 2018)
Can Public Diplomacy Survive the Internet: Bots, Echo Chambers, and Disinformation (with Shawn Powers, May 2017)
Chinese Influence & American Interests: Promoting Constructive Vigilance (Working Group member, November 2018)
The Hard Truth About Soft Power (with Andras Simonyi, August 2011)

Film
The War Prayer  (short film, 2007)

Notes

References

External links
Markos Kounalakis Interview – NAMM Oral History Library (2020)
Antonios Markos Kounalakis by Markos Kounalakis

1956 births
Living people
American male journalists
American magazine publishers (people)
Columbia University Graduate School of Journalism alumni
University of California, Berkeley alumni
American writers of Greek descent